BRCA1-associated RING domain protein 1 is a protein that in humans is encoded by the BARD1 gene. The human BARD1 protein is 777 amino acids long and contains a RING finger domain (residues 46-90), four ankyrin repeats (residues 420-555), and two tandem BRCT domains (residues 568-777).

Function 

Most, if not all, BRCA1 heterodimerizes with BARD1 in vivo. BARD1 and BRCA1 form a heterodimer via their N-terminal RING finger domains. The BARD1-BRCA1 interaction is observed in vivo and in vitro and is essential for BRCA1 stability. BARD1 shares homology with the two most conserved regions of BRCA1: the N-terminal RING motif and the C-terminal BRCT domain. The RING motif is a cysteine-rich sequence found in a variety of proteins that regulate cell growth, including the products of tumor suppressor genes and dominant protooncogenes, and developmentally important genes such as the polycomb group of genes. The BARD1 protein also contains three tandem ankyrin repeats.

The BARD1/BRCA1 interaction is disrupted by tumorigenic amino acid substitutions in BRCA1, implying that the formation of a stable complex between these proteins may be an essential aspect of BRCA1 tumor suppression.  BARD1 may be the target of oncogenic mutations in breast or ovarian cancer. Mutations in the BARD1 protein that affect its structure appear in many breast, ovarian, and uterine cancers, suggesting the mutations disable BARD1's tumor suppressor function. Three missense mutations, each affecting BARD1's BRCT domain, are known to be implicated in cancers: C645R is associated with breast and ovarian cancers, V695L is associated with breast cancer, and S761N is associated with breast and uterine cancers. BARD1 expression is upregulated by genotoxic stress and involved in apoptosis through binding and stabilizing p53 independently of BRCA1.

BARD1 is vital in the rapid relocation of BRCA1 to DNA damage sites. BARD1 tandem BRCA1 C-terminus (BRCT) motifs fold into a binding pocket with a key lysine residue (K619), and bind to poly(ADP-ribose) (PAR), which targets the BRCA1/BARD1 heterodimer to damaged DNA sites. Double stranded breaks (DSB) in DNA trigger poly(ADPribose) polymerase 1 (PARP1) to catalyze the formation of poly(ADPribose) (PAR) so that PAR can then bind to an array of DNA response proteins, including the BRCA1/BARD1 heterodimer, and target them to DNA damage sites. When the BRCA1/BARD1 heterodimer is transported to the damaged DNA site, it acts as an E3 ubiquitin ligase. The BRCA1/BARD1 heterodimer ubiquitinates RNA polymerase II, preventing the transcription of the damaged DNA, and restoring genetic stability.

DNA repair

BRCA1-BARD1 appears to have an important function in the recruitment of RAD51 protein to DNA double-strand breaks which is a crucial early step in the homologous recombinational repair of these breaks.  It is likely that BRCA1-BARD1 functions as part of a higher-order “homologous recombination mediator complex” along with two other tumor suppressor proteins BRCA2 and PALB2.

Interactions 

BARD1 has been shown to interact with:

 AURKB,
 BCL3, 
 BRCA1, 
 BRCA2, 
 BRCC3, 
 BRE, 
 CSTF1, 
 CSTF2, 
 EWSR1, 
 FANCD2, 
 H2AFX, 
 NPM1, 
 P53,
 RAD51, 
 TACC1, and
 UBE2D1.

Implication in Cancer Treatments 
If a cancer cell's capacity to repair DNA damage were incapacitated, cancer treatments would be more effective. Inhibiting cancer cells' BRCA1/BARD1 heterodimer from relocating to DNA damage sites would induce tumor cell death rather than repair. One inhibition possibility is the BARD1 BRCT key lysine residue (K619). Inhibiting this lysine residue's ability to bind poly(ADP-ribose) would prevent the BRCA1/BARD1 heterodimer from localizing to DNA damage sites and subsequently prevent DNA damage repair. This would make cancer therapies such as chemotherapy and radiation vastly more effective.

References

External links

Further reading 

 
 
 
 
 
 
 
 
 
 
 
 
 
 
 
 
 
 

Proteins